Terrell Williams (born June 19, 1974) is an American football coach and former player who is the assistant head coach and defensive line coach for the Tennessee Titans of the National Football League (NFL).

College career
Williams is originally from Los Angeles. He played nose guard at East Carolina and helped the Pirates to a Liberty Bowl victory over Stanford in 1995. He received a bachelor's degree in communications with a minor in history. From 1998 until 2011, Williams coached at the collegiate level at six different institutions - all as a defensive line coach. He started his career at Fort Scott (Kansas) Community College, followed by two years at North Carolina A&T, two years at Youngstown State, two years at Akron, four years at Purdue, and two years at Texas A&M.

Professional career
During his college coaching tenure, Williams had three summer internships in the NFL. In the summer of 1999, he assisted the Jacksonville Jaguars with the defensive line. Williams had similar roles with the Seattle Seahawks in 2007 and with the Dallas Cowboys in 2008.

Oakland Raiders
In 2012, Williams accepted his first full time position at the professional level when he joined head coach Dennis Allen as defensive line coach with the Oakland Raiders. In 2014, Williams' unit helped the defense rank eighth in the NFL in fewest rushing yards allowed per play and finished second in the NFL in tackles recorded at or behind the line of scrimmage.

Miami Dolphins
In 2015, Williams joined the Miami Dolphins as defensive line coach under head coach Joe Philbin. He was to serve in the same role with the Florida Gators but left on the National Signing Day. Williams continued his role with the Dolphins in 2016 and 2017 under head coach Adam Gase. In 2016, Williams helped the Dolphins to their most successful season in eight years, winning 10 games and earning their first playoff berth since 2008. Defensive linemen Cameron Wake and Ndamukong Suh flourished under Williams's three-year stint with the Dolphins. Wake tallied 29 sacks, which was the eighth-highest total by a player in that period, while Ndamukong Suh totaled the eighth-highest number of sacks (15.5) among defensive tackles. Wake's nine forced fumbles tied for fifth in the NFL over the same span.

Tennessee Titans
In 2018, Williams joined head coach Mike Vrabel with the Tennessee Titans. In his first year, the Titans defense ranked eighth overall (333.4 yards per game), third in points allowed (18.9 per game), 10th on third down (36.6 percent) and second in the red zone (44.7 touchdown percentage). In 2019, Williams helped the Titans to the AFC championship game.

Family life
Williams and his wife, Tifini, have two sons: Tahj and Tyson. Tyson died at the age of 4 in 2012 from a sudden and unexpected illness.

References

External links
 Florida profile
 Purdue profile
 Titans profile

1974 births
Living people
African-American coaches of American football
African-American players of American football
American football defensive linemen
Akron Zips football coaches
East Carolina Pirates football players
Florida Gators football coaches
Fort Scott Greyhounds football coaches
Miami Dolphins coaches
North Carolina A&T Aggies football coaches
Oakland Raiders coaches
Purdue Boilermakers football coaches
Players of American football from Los Angeles
Tennessee Titans coaches
Texas A&M Aggies football coaches
Youngstown State Penguins football coaches
21st-century African-American sportspeople
20th-century African-American sportspeople
Sports coaches from Los Angeles